Xhaferi is a surname. Notable people with the name include:

Arbën Xhaferi (1948–2012), Albanian politician 
Talat Xhaferi (born 1962), Macedonian politician, former Minister of Defense and currently Speaker of the Parliament
Ymer Xhaferi (born 1985), Kosovan footballer

Albanian-language surnames